The 2006–07 season is the 29th season in the fourth division of English football, and their 92nd season as a professional club played by Northampton Town F.C., a football club based in Northampton, Northamptonshire, England.

Players

Competitions

League One

League table

Results summary

League position by match

Matches

FA Cup

Carling Cup

Johnstone's Paint Trophy

Appearances, goals and cards

Northampton Town F.C. seasons
Northampton Town